Abdul Hakku Nediyodath (born 6 October  1994) often called as Hakku, is an Indian professional footballer who plays as a defender for I-League club Gokulam Kerala.

Club career

Early career and DSK Shivajians 
Born in Kerala, Hakku spent five youth years in the Sports Academy Tirur (SAT) before signing with DSK Shivajians, along with four other players. While with the youth team, Hakku played in various competitions with the club. On 26 January 2016, Hakku made his professional debut for DSK Shivajians in the I-League against East Bengal. He played the full-match and earned a yellow card as DSK Shivajians lost the match 1–0.

Fateh Hyderabad
In December 2016, Hakku signed for 2nd division club Fateh Hyderabad for 2nd division I- League season. He scored his first senior team goal with the club in the 2016–17 I-League 2nd Division season.

NorthEast United
In July 2017, Northeast United FC picked Abdul Hakku in 2017–18 ISL Players Draft as their 12th pick. He won the Emerging Player Award in his debut match against Jamshedpur FC on November 18, 2017.

Kerala Blasters FC
In 2018, it was announced that Hakku's Hometown club Kerala Blasters FC signed him. However he wasn't a first choice player and didn't get many games with the club. He played 2 games coming on as a substitute on both occasions in the 2018–19 Indian Super League season.

During the 2019–20 season, Hakku became the first choice during some matches as the team were struggling due to injury problems. He made a total of 5 appearances for the club during the season.

On 29 July 2020, it was announced that Hakku has extended the contract with the Blasters till 2023. On 27 December, he scored his first ever goal for the Blasters against Hyderabad FC in the 29th minute, where the Blasters won the game 2–0.

Hakku was included in the Kerala Blasters squad for the 2021 Durand Cup, and played his first match against Indian Navy on 11 September, where he was injured within the first 15 minutes, but the Blasters won the match 1–0 at full-time. He played his first match in the 2021–22 Indian Super League season against SC East Bengal on 12 December as a substitute for Enes Sipovic, which ended in a 1–1 draw.

Gokulam Kerala FC (loan) 
On 23 December, it was announced Abdul Hakku, along with Sreekuttan V. S. has been loaned to Gokulam Kerala FC for the 2021–22 I-League season.

Career statistics

Club

Honours 

Kerala Blasters
 Indian Super League runner up: 2021–22.

Gokulam Kerala
 I-League: 2021–22

References

External links
 https://telanganatoday.news/fateh-goalless-draw-formidable-neroca
 http://fatehhyderabad.com/teams/senior-team/

1994 births
Living people
Indian footballers
DSK Shivajians FC players
Association football defenders
Footballers from Kerala
I-League players
Kerala Blasters FC players
I-League 2nd Division players
Fateh Hyderabad A.F.C. players
Indian Super League players
NorthEast United FC players
Gokulam Kerala FC players
Real Kashmir FC players